Windsor Public Schools is a school district in Windsor, Connecticut.

High schools
Windsor High School

Middle schools
Sage Park Middle School

Elementary schools
Clover Street School
John F. Kennedy School
Oliver Ellsworth School
Poquonock School

External links
 Official website

 
Education in Hartford County, Connecticut
School districts in Connecticut